Lieli is a village in the canton of Lucerne, Switzerland. The former municipality of the district of Hochdorf merged with Hohenrain on January 1, 2007 to form Hohenrain.

History
Lieli is first mentioned around 900 as Lielae.  In the local Swiss German dialect it was as Nieli as far back as the 17th Century.

Geography

The village became part of the municipality of Hohenrain in 2007.

Demographics
The historical population is given in the following table:

References

Former municipalities of the canton of Lucerne